Champwood is an unincorporated community on Patterson Creek in Mineral County, West Virginia, United States. It is part of the 'Cumberland, MD-WV Metropolitan Statistical Area'. Champwood lies along West Virginia Route 46.

The name is a portmanteau of Champ Clark and Woodrow Wilson, who were, respectively, an early settler and the U.S. President.

References 

Unincorporated communities in Mineral County, West Virginia
Unincorporated communities in West Virginia